Vapor wake canines are dogs that have been trained to alert their human handlers to the presence of explosive threats so that they can be stopped before they become a danger, and these dogs can track explosive trails to potential bombers.

References

Police dogs